UFC 192: Cormier vs. Gustafsson was a mixed martial arts event held on October 3, 2015, at the Toyota Center in Houston, Texas.

Background
The event was the fourth that the promotion has hosted in Houston, and the first since UFC 166 in 2013.

The event was headlined by a UFC Light Heavyweight Championship bout between current champion Daniel Cormier and top contender Alexander Gustafsson. The bout was initially linked as the event headliner for UFC 191. However, the bout was postponed to this event as a result of Cormier's knee injury.

Leslie Smith was expected to face Raquel Pennington at this event. However, Smith was forced to pull out of the event due to injury and Pennington was rebooked against a separate opponent at another event.

Anthony Hamilton was expected to face Derrick Lewis at the event. However, Hamilton was pulled from the bout and replaced by Viktor Pešta.

Johny Hendricks was set to face Tyron Woodley in the co-main event. However, Hendricks pulled out of the fight on the day of the weigh-ins due to a kidney stone and intestinal blockage suffered during his weight cut. Therefore, the fight was canceled.

Francisco Treviño missed weight on his first attempt at the weigh ins, coming in at 160 lb. He was given additional time to make the weight limit, but made no attempts to cut further. Instead, he was fined 20 percent of his fight purse, which went to Sage Northcutt.

On October 15, it was announced that Treviño tested positive for marijuana in post-fight tests. If Treviño was found by the Texas Department of Licensing and Regulation's enforcement division to have violated its rules, he would face a one-year probated suspension, in which he can still fight provided he does not break any more rules, or a full one-year suspension. He also faced up to a $5,000 fine.

Results

Bonus awards
The following fighters each received $50,000 bonuses:
Fight of the Night: Daniel Cormier vs. Alexander Gustafsson
Performance of the Night: Albert Tumenov and Adriano Martins

See also
List of UFC events
2015 in UFC

References

Ultimate Fighting Championship events
Mixed martial arts in Houston
2015 in mixed martial arts
Sports competitions in Houston
2015 in sports in Texas
October 2015 sports events in the United States